Zamfir Dumitrescu (15 April 1946 – 6 February 2021) was a Romanian painter.

Zamfir Dumitrescu was born in Bucharest, Romania. He graduated in 1970 from the Nicolae Grigorescu  Institute of Art Bucharest, the class of Corneliu Baba.

He was the Dean of the Faculty of Fine Arts between 2000 and 2004, and since 2002 he was the President of the Union of Fine Arts from Romania.

Awards
 First Award at the Balkan Artists's International Competition Real Painting (19 November 2004), Sofia.
 Romanian Academy Award George Oprescu (21 December 2004).

External links
 Official website - Biography, Portfolio and Media Center

1946 births
2021 deaths
Artists from Bucharest
Romanian painters
Bucharest National University of Arts alumni